FC Bulle is a Swiss football club, based in Bulle. Their home ground is the Stade de Bouleyres.

History
Founded in 1910, they last played in the Swiss top tier in 1992–93. That was ten years after their previous spell at the highest level.

Current squad

External links
Official website 

Bulle, FC
Bulle
Bulle
1910 establishments in Switzerland